Vladimir Banjanac (born 13 October 1966) is a Serbian rower. He competed at the 1988 Summer Olympics and the 1992 Summer Olympics.

References

1966 births
Living people
Serbian male rowers
Olympic rowers of Yugoslavia
Olympic rowers as Independent Olympic Participants
Rowers at the 1988 Summer Olympics
Rowers at the 1992 Summer Olympics
Place of birth missing (living people)